Poland competed at the 2022 Winter Olympics in Beijing, China, from 4 to 20 February 2022.

On January 25, 2022, long track speed skaters Zbigniew Bródka and Natalia Czerwonka were named as the Polish flagbearers during the opening ceremony. On February 2, 2022, snowboarder Aleksandra Król replaced Czerwonka, who tested positive for COVID-19 at the arrival. Meanwhile  Piotr Michalski was the flagbearer during the closing ceremony.

Medalists 

The following Polish competitors won medals at the games. In the discipline sections below, the medalists' names are bolded.

Competitors
The following is the list of number of competitors participating at the Games per sport.

Alpine skiing

Poland qualified one male and three female alpine skiers.  They also received an additional male quota to compete in the team event and claimed one more female quota during reallocation.

Men

Women

Mixed

Biathlon 

Based on their Nations Cup ranking in the 2020–21 and 2020–21 Biathlon World Cup, Poland has qualified 4 women and 1 man.

Men

Women

Cross-country skiing

Poland has qualified four male and five female cross-country skiers.

Men

Women

Sprint

Figure skating

In the 2021 World Figure Skating Championships in Stockholm, Sweden, Poland secured one quota in the ice dance competition.

Luge

Based on the results from the fall World Cups during the 2021–22 Luge World Cup season, Poland earned the following start quotas:

Mixed team relay

Nordic combined

Poland qualified two athletes.

Short track speed skating 

Poland has qualified four skaters for women's 500 m, 1000 m and 1500 m events and relay for the Olympics. They have also qualified a men's quota for the 1500 m and an additional men's quota to compete in the mixed relay.

Men

Women

Mixed

Ski jumping 

Poland has qualified five male and two female ski jumpers.

Men

Women

Mixed

Snowboarding 

According to the quota allocation list, Poland qualified five athletes.

Parallel

Speed skating 

Based on the results from the fall World Cups during the 2021–22 ISU Speed Skating World Cup season, Poland earned the following start quotas:
Men

Women

Mass start

Team pursuit

References

Nations at the 2022 Winter Olympics
2022
Winter Olympics